The 1947 South Carolina State Bulldogs football team was an American football team that represented South Carolina State University during the 1947 college football season. In its second season under head coach Oliver C. Dawson, the team compiled a 7–1–2, defeated  in the Pecan Bowl, and outscored all opponents by a total of 123 to 46. The team ranked No. 10 among the nation's black college football teams according to the Pittsburgh Courier and its Dickinson Rating System. The team's only loss was to No. 5 Shaw.

Schedule

References

South Carolina State
South Carolina State Bulldogs football seasons
South Carolina State Bulldogs football